The 1984 Auburn Tigers football team represented Auburn University in the 1984 NCAA Division I-A football season. Coached by Pat Dye, the team finished the season with an 8–4 record and won the Liberty Bowl over Arkansas. As of 2022, the 1984 team is the only Auburn team to be ranked first in the preseason AP Poll.

Schedule

Roster

Rankings

Game summaries

vs. Miami (FL)

at Texas

Source: Box score

Southern Miss

at Florida State

at Florida

Cincinnati

Georgia

vs. Alabama

vs. Arkansas (Liberty Bowl)

References

Auburn
Auburn Tigers football seasons
Liberty Bowl champion seasons
Auburn Tigers football